Lauren Frances Book (born October 12, 1984) is an American politician and former educator who has served in the Florida Senate since 2016, representing parts of Broward County. A member of the Democratic Party, she has been the Senate's minority leader since April 28, 2021.

Early life and education
Book was born in Hollywood, Florida, in 1984 to Patricia "Pat" Book, a former chocolate retailer, and Ron Book, a lawyer and lobbyist. She is the oldest of three siblings. Book was sexually abused as a child over the course of six years by her nanny. She developed anorexia as a result of the abuse. In 2002, the nanny pleaded guilty to five felony charges and was sentenced to 10 years in prison, later extended to 25 years. In 2007, Book created a charity, Lauren's Kids, to fight for stronger penalties for sex offenders.

Book graduated from the University of Miami in 2008 with a Bachelor of Arts degree in elementary education. Following graduation, she taught for one year in Miami-Dade County Public Schools.

Since 2010, Book has annually led "Walk in My Shoes", a  walk from Key West, to Tallahassee, Florida. She has written two books: Lauren's Kingdom and It's OK to Tell: A Story of Hope and Recovery. She designed an abuse prevention curriculum for implementation in Florida kindergartens.

In 2012, Book was awarded her master's degree in community psychology from the University of Miami.

Career
Book ran unopposed for the 32nd district seat in the Florida Senate in 2016. In the 2017 session, Book filed a bill that would remove Confederate Memorial Day, celebrated on April 26, 2017, from Florida's list of 21 legal holidays. Her bill would also remove the birthdays of Robert E. Lee and Jefferson Davis as official state holidays. Book told CBS4, "during a time when the country is completely divided, I think we look at celebrating our unique coming together instead of some of the things that kind of create hate and divisive environments."

On July 22, 2019, Book wrote Florida governor Ron DeSantis a letter requesting a probe into how the Palm Beach County Sheriff's Office handled a work release program for Jeffrey Epstein. Following her request, Book reported that she began receiving calls from political supporters of Palm Beach County Sheriff Ric Bradshaw, asking her to drop the request for an inquiry. The Miami Herald reported that Book also received multiple anonymous calls and texts with more ominous demands to halt her request for a probe.

Book voted against the controversial Florida Senate Bill 86, which would have changed implementation and administration of the Bright Futures Scholarship Program.

After the Democrats' incoming Senate leader for 2022–24, Bobby Powell, decided to run for Congress, the Democratic caucus unanimously chose Book to be its leader for the 2022–24 legislature. A week later, on April 28, 2021, the Democratic caucus chose Book to serve immediately as minority leader, following a no-confidence vote in then-leader Gary Farmer.

Personal life
Book married Kris Lim, a professional golfer, in 2008; their wedding was featured on We TV's Platinum Weddings. They divorced in 2010. In 2015, she married Blair Byrnes. They are the parents of twins, born on February 16, 2017.

In 2021, a 19-year-old Floridian was charged with cyberstalking and attempting to extort Book, threatening to release nude images of her. Book later learned that the images have been bought and sold since 2020.

References

External links
Florida Senate - Lauren Book

|-

1984 births
21st-century American Jews
21st-century American non-fiction writers
21st-century American politicians
21st-century American women politicians
21st-century American women writers
American women non-fiction writers
Democratic Party Florida state senators
Jewish American state legislators in Florida
Living people
Non-profit organizations based in Florida
NSU University School alumni
People from Hollywood, Florida
Women state legislators in Florida
21st-century American women educators
21st-century American educators
Jewish educators
Educators from Florida